A monastery was founded by St Laiseran before 640 on the site of the present ruins of the medieval Old Priory at the junction of High Street, Victoria Road and the Old Bangor Road in Holywood, County Down. The present ruins are late 12th / early 13th century Anglo-Norman Augustinian Abbey built by Thomas Whyte and much of these ruins remain as the fabric of the structure.  The church consists of a nave & chancel without structural division, 22.5m x 6m internally, with a West tower. The original building is late 12th / early 13th Century & entered on South. In the 15th Century, the West end was rebuilt with a new entrance & the East window replaced. The upper levels of the tower were added in 18th Century. Some of the masonry is 'Cultra Stone' ashlar (a creamy white limestone - also used in the nearby Mortello Tower windmill stump and Carrickfergus Castle) and red sandstone. The Cultra Stone is also used for masonry dressings at Ardkeen and Ballywalter churches as well as other churches in the wider Ards area.

In the South wall are 3/4 17th Century windows, now all blocked up. Also built into the South wall was a 13th Century coffin lid, now removed to the North Down Heritage centre, Bangor. The coffin lid has a St. Andrew's style cross  of eight points rising from a calvary. The main body of the coffin lid was decorated with foliage, although one branch had been omitted, "...for the purpose of leaving room for the emblem of a pair of shears, which probably indicated that the monument was that of a female, the sword being the corresponding male emblem on grave slabs of this class."  There is also a piscina with trefoil head & dog-tooth ornament. After the Black death (1348-1350) Niall O’Neill refurbished the church for the Franciscan Order. The Priory was dissolved on New Years Day, 1541, by Henry VIII with its lands passing into the hands of the O’Neill family and then to Sir James Hamilton, First Viscount Clandeboye. Hamilton laid out the town, with a maypole at the crossroads and most of the early buildings are clustered round the Priory.

The site was known as Santus Boscus or Santus Nemus by the early 13th Century and the church of Haliwode is listed in the Taxation of Pope Nicholas - c.1300 - as being worth 6 marks. In 1210 it is recorded that: "...King John halted 'apud sanctum Boscum' when on his way from Carrickfergus to Downpatrick." In 1217 Jordanus de Saukevill was confirmed by Henry III in the possession of his lands 'de Sancto Bosco'. (Ibid).

History 

7th century: Laiseran (later saint) son of Nasca, a local princess, studied at Bangor under St. Comgall and after a time near Cork, returned to found the first church and monastery. There is some uncertainty whether the site was at the current priory ruins or near the motte by Brooke Street.

10th century: the Vikings ravage the area in 956 

12th/13th century: an Anglo-Norman Augustinian abbey built by Thomas Whyte; current ruins largely date from this time

14th century: after the Black Death (1348–1350) Niall O’Neill refurbished the church for the Franciscan Order

16th century: the priory was dissolved on New Years Day, 1541, by Henry VIII; its lands passed to the O’Neill family and later, Sir James Hamilton, First Viscount Clandeboye

19th century: the tower dates from 1806 when this was the site of Holywood's Parish Church

Graveyard 

The adjacent graveyard accommodates:
 educational reformer, Dr Robert Sullivan
 members of the Praeger family
 the Dunville family (of whiskey fame)
 mathematician Sir Joseph Larmor

See also
 Abbeys and priories in Northern Ireland (County Down)

References 

Buildings and structures in County Down
Christian monasteries in Northern Ireland
Christian monasteries established in the 7th century
Franciscan monasteries in Northern Ireland
Augustinian monasteries in Northern Ireland
Religion in County Down
Holywood, County Down
Archaeological sites in County Down
1541 disestablishments
Monasteries dissolved under the Irish Reformation
7th-century churches in the United Kingdom